John Argyropoulos (Ioannis Argyropoulos; ; surname also spelt Argyropulus, or Argyropulos, or Argyropulo; c. 1415 – 26 June 1487) was a  lecturer, philosopher and humanist, one of the émigré Greek scholars who pioneered the revival of classical Greek learning in 15th century Italy.

He translated Greek philosophical and theological works into Latin besides producing rhetorical and theological works of his own. He was in Italy for the Council of Florence during 1439–1444, and returned to Italy following the Fall of Constantinople, teaching in Florence (at the Florentine Studium) in 1456–1470 and in Rome in 1471–1487.

Biography
John Argyropoulos was born c. 1415 in Constantinople where he studied theology and philosophy. As a teacher in Constantinople, Argyropoulos had amongst his pupils the scholar Constantine Lascaris. He was an official in the service of one of the rulers of the Byzantine Morea and in 1439 was a member of the Byzantine delegation to the Council of Florence, when they accepted Catholicism and abjured Greek Orthodoxy.

In 1443/4, he received a Doctor of Theology degree from the University of Padua before returning to Constantinople.

When Constantinople fell in 1453, he left it for Peloponnisos and, in 1456, took refuge in Italy, where he worked as a teacher in the revival of Greek philosophy as head of the Greek department at Florence's Florentine Studium. In 1471, on the outbreak of the plague, he moved to Rome, where he continued to act as a teacher of Greek till his death. His students included Pietro de' Medici, Lorenzo de' Medici, Angelo Poliziano, Johann Reuchlin, Jacques Lefèvre d'Étaples and Leonardo da Vinci.

He also made efforts to transport Greek philosophy to Western Europe by leaving a number of Latin translations, including many of Aristotle's works. His principal works were translations of the following portions of Aristotle, Categoriae, De Interpretatione, Analytica Posteriora, Physica, De Caelo, De Anima, Metaphysica, Ethica Nicomachea, Politica; and an Expositio Ethicorum Aristotelis. Several of his writings still exist in manuscript.

He died on 26 June 1487 in Florence, supposedly of consuming too much watermelon.

See also
Greek scholars in the Renaissance

Notes

References
 
 Geanakoplos, Deno J., Constantinople and the West: Essays on the Late Byzantine (Palaeologan) and Italian Renaissances and the Byzantine and Roman Churches, University of Wisconsin Press, 1989, 
 Geanakoplos, Deno J., A Byzantine looks at the Renaissance – Greek, Roman and Byzantine Studies.
 Harris, Jonathan, 'Byzantines in Renaissance Italy', Online Reference Book for Medieval Studies.
 Vassileiou, Fotis & Saribalidou, Barbara, Short Biographical Lexicon of Byzantine Academics Immigrants in Western Europe, 2007, 
 Nicholl Charles, Leonardo Da Vinci: The Flights of the Mind, Penguin Books Ltd, 2005, 
 Vassileiou Fotis, Saribalidou Barbara, 'John Argyropoulos teacher of Leonardo da Vinci', Philosophy Pathways, Issue 117, 19 May 2006, International Society for Philosophers
Migné, Patrologia Graeca vol. 158 (documentacatholicaomnia.eu)

External links

 

1410s births
1487 deaths
John
Writers from Constantinople
Constantinopolitan Greeks
Former Greek Orthodox Christians
Byzantine philosophers
Greek Renaissance humanists
Greek–Latin translators
Greek Roman Catholics
Converts to Roman Catholicism from Eastern Orthodoxy
15th-century Byzantine people
15th-century Byzantine writers
15th-century Greek people
15th-century Greek writers
15th-century Greek educators
People from Constantinople